Angels in Disguise may refer to:

Angels in Disguise (film), a 1949 Bowery Boys film
Angels in Disguise (album), a 2002 album by Interface

See also
Angel in Disguise (disambiguation)